Island City is an unincorporated community in Stockton Township, Greene County, Indiana.

Island City was the name of the Island City Coal Co.

Geography

References

Unincorporated communities in Greene County, Indiana
Unincorporated communities in Indiana